Mardin Airport is an airport in Mardin, southeastern Turkey , located in Kızıltepe,  southeast of Mardin. On 17 December 2022, the airport was renamed Mardin Prof. Dr. Aziz Sancar Airport (Mardin Prof. Dr. Aziz Sancar Havalimanı) in honor of Nobel laureate Aziz Sancar   (born 1946), who is a native of Mardin.

Airlines and destinations

Traffic statistics 

(*)Source: DHMI.gov.tr

References 

 

Airports in Turkey
Buildings and structures in Mardin Province
Transport in Mardin Province